Erlanger Western Carolina Hospital is a hospital located in Murphy, North Carolina certified by the United States Department of Health and Human Services.  Erlanger Murphy Medical Center is the only hospital west of Bryson City and Franklin. The hospital is licensed for 191 beds. Of the 191 beds, 120 are nursing home beds, 57 are general beds, and 14 are beds for patients with Alzheimer's disease.

It is affiliated with Erlanger Health System, based in Chattanooga, TN. In January 2019, Erlanger renamed the facility, "Erlanger Western Carolina Hospital."

Quality ratings
Much hospital quality information exists in the HealthGrades website concerning this hospital. HealthGrades shows twelve quality indicators; these are rated as one star, three stars and five stars. This hospital scored as follows:

 one star - one rating
 three stars - nine ratings
 five stars - one rating.

The hospital was rated on nine patient-safety indicators. Murphy Medical Center received the following ratings:

 worse than average - three ratings
 average - five ratings
 better than average - one rating.

The Nursing Home Rating website has quality information about the nursing home part of Erlanger Murphy Medical Center. Its overall rating was four of five possible stars, with five stars being the best possible rating. This information was generated in 2013.

References

External links 
 Erlanger Murphy Medical Center

Hospitals in North Carolina
Buildings and structures in Cherokee County, North Carolina